Pinnipeds (pronounced ), commonly known as seals, are a widely distributed and diverse clade of carnivorous, fin-footed, semiaquatic, mostly marine  mammals. They comprise the extant families Odobenidae (whose only living member is the walrus), Otariidae (the eared seals: sea lions and fur seals), and Phocidae (the earless seals, or true seals). There are 34 extant species of pinnipeds, and more than 50 extinct species have been described from fossils. While seals were historically thought to have descended from two ancestral lines, molecular evidence supports them as a monophyletic lineage (descended from one ancestral line). Pinnipeds belong to the order Carnivora; their closest living relatives are musteloids (weasels, raccoons, skunks, and red pandas), having diverged about 50 million years ago.

Several species exhibit sexual dimorphism. They have streamlined bodies and four limbs that are modified into flippers. Though not as fast in the water as dolphins, seals are more flexible and agile. Otariids use their front limbs primarily to propel themselves through the water, while phocids and walruses use their hind limbs. Otariids and walruses have hind limbs that can be pulled under the body and used as legs on land. By comparison, terrestrial locomotion by phocids is more cumbersome. Otariids have visible external ears, while phocids and walruses lack these. Pinnipeds have well-developed senses—their eyesight and hearing are adapted for both air and water, and they have an advanced tactile system in their whiskers or vibrissae. Some species are well adapted for diving to great depths. They have a layer of fat, or blubber, under the skin to keep warm in the cold water, and, other than the walrus, all species are covered in fur.

Although pinnipeds are widespread, most species prefer the colder waters of the Northern and Southern Hemispheres. They spend most of their lives in the water, but come ashore to mate, give birth, molt or escape from predators, such as sharks and orcas. Seals mainly live in marine environments but can also be found in freshwater. They feed largely on fish and marine invertebrates; a few, such as the leopard seal, feed on large vertebrates, such as penguins and other seals. Walruses are specialized for feeding on bottom-dwelling mollusks. Male pinnipeds typically mate with more than one female (polygyny), although the degree of polygyny varies with the species. The males of land-breeding species tend to mate with a greater number of females than those of ice breeding species. Male pinniped strategies for reproductive success vary between defending females, defending territories that attract females and performing ritual displays or lek mating. Pups are typically born in the spring and summer months and females bear almost all the responsibility for raising them. Mothers of some species fast and nurse their young for a relatively short period of time while others take foraging trips at sea between nursing bouts. Walruses are known to nurse their young while at sea. Seals produce a number of vocalizations, notably the barks of California sea lions, the gong-like calls of walruses and the complex songs of Weddell seals.

The meat, blubber and fur coats of pinnipeds have traditionally been used by indigenous peoples of the Arctic. Seals have been depicted in various cultures worldwide. They are commonly kept in captivity and are even sometimes trained to perform tricks and tasks. Once relentlessly hunted by commercial industries for their products, seals and walruses are now protected by international law. The Japanese sea lion and the Caribbean monk seal have become extinct in the past century, while the Mediterranean monk seal and Hawaiian monk seal are ranked endangered by the International Union for Conservation of Nature. Besides hunting, pinnipeds also face threats from accidental trapping, marine pollution, and conflicts with local people.

Etymology
The name "pinniped" derives from the Latin words pinna "fin" and pes, pedis "foot". The common name "seal" originates from the Old English word seolh, which is in turn derived from the Proto-Germanic *selkhaz.

Taxonomy and evolution

Taxonomy

The German naturalist Johann Karl Wilhelm Illiger was the first to recognize the pinnipeds as a distinct taxonomic unit; in 1811 he gave the name Pinnipedia to both a family and an order. American zoologist Joel Asaph Allen reviewed the world's pinnipeds in an 1880 monograph, History of North American pinnipeds, a monograph of the walruses, sea-lions, sea-bears and seals of North America. In this publication, he traced the history of names, gave keys to families and genera, described North American species and provided synopses of species in other parts of the world. In 1989, Annalisa Berta and colleagues proposed the unranked clade Pinnipedimorpha to contain the fossil genus Enaliarctos and modern seals as a sister group. Pinnipeds belong to the order Carnivora and the suborder Caniformia (known as dog-like carnivorans). Pinnipedia was historically considered its own suborder under Carnivora. Of the three extant families, the Otariidae and Odobenidae are grouped in the superfamily Otarioidea, while the Phocidae belong to the superfamily Phocoidea. There are 34 extant species of pinnipeds, and more than 50 fossil species.

Otariids are also known as eared seals due to the presence of pinnae. These animals rely on their well-developed fore-flippers to propel themselves through the water. They can also turn their hind-flippers forward and "walk" on land. The anterior end of an otariid's frontal bones extends between the nasal bones, and the supraorbital foramen is large and flat horizontally. The supraspinatous fossas are divided by a "secondary spine" and the bronchi are divided anteriorly. Otariids consist of two types: sea lions and fur seals. Sea lions are distinguished by their rounder snouts and shorter, rougher pelage, while fur seals have more pointed snouts, longer fore-flippers and thicker fur coats that include an undercoat and guard hairs. The former also tend to be larger than the latter. Five genera and seven species (one now extinct) of sea lion are known to exist, while two genera and nine species of fur seal exist. While sea lions and fur seals have historically been considered separate subfamilies (Otariinae and Arctocephalinae respectively), a 2001 genetic study found that the northern fur seal is more closely related to several sea lion species. This is supported by a 2006 molecular study that also found that the Australian sea lion and New Zealand sea lion are more closely related to Arctocephalus than to other sea lions.

Odobenidae consists of only one living member: the modern walrus. This animal is easily distinguished from other extant pinnipeds by its larger size (exceeded only by the elephant seals), nearly hairless skin and long upper canines, known as tusks. Like otariids, walruses are capable of turning their hind-flippers forward and can walk on land. When moving in water, the walrus relies on its hind-flippers for locomotion, while its fore-flippers are used for steering. In addition, the walrus lacks external ear flaps. Walruses have pterygoid bones that are broad and thick, frontal bones that are V-shaped at the anterior end and calcaneuses with pronounced tuberosity in the middle.

Phocids are known as true or "earless" seals. These animals lack external ear flaps and are incapable of turning their hind-flippers forward, which makes them more cumbersome on land. In water, true seals swim by moving their hind-flippers and lower body from side to side. Phocids have thickened mastoids, enlarged entotympanic bones, everted pelvic bones and massive ankle bones. They also lack supraorbital processes on the frontal and have underdeveloped calcaneal tubers. A 2006 molecular study supports the division of phocids into two monophyletic subfamilies: Monachinae, which consists of Mirounga, Monachini and Lobodontini; and Phocinae, which includes Pusa, Phoca, Halichoerus, Histriophoca, Pagophilus, Erignathus and Cystophora.

Evolutionary history

One popular hypothesis suggested that pinnipeds are diphyletic (descended from two ancestral lines), with walruses and otariids sharing a recent common ancestor with bears and phocids sharing one with Musteloidea. However, morphological and molecular evidence support a monophyletic origin. A 2021 genetic study found that pinnipeds are more closely related to musteloids. Pinnipeds split from other caniforms 50 million years ago (mya) during the Eocene. Their evolutionary link to terrestrial mammals was unknown until the 2007 discovery of Puijila in early Miocene deposits in Nunavut, Canada. Like a modern otter, Puijila had a long tail, short limbs and webbed feet instead of flippers. However, its limbs and shoulders were more robust and Puijila likely had been a quadrupedal swimmer—retaining a form of aquatic locomotion that gave rise to the major swimming types employed by modern pinnipeds. The researchers who found Puijila placed it in a clade with Potamotherium (traditionally considered a mustelid) and Enaliarctos. Of the three, Puijila was the least specialized for aquatic life. The discovery of Puijila in a lake deposit suggests that pinniped evolution went through a freshwater transitional phase.

Enaliarctos, a fossil species of late Oligocene/early Miocene (24–22 mya) California, closely resembled modern pinnipeds; it was adapted to an aquatic life with a flexible spine, and limbs modified into flippers. Its teeth were adapted for shearing (like terrestrial carnivorans), and it may have stayed near shore more often than its extant relatives. Enaliarctos was capable of swimming with both the fore-flippers and hind-flippers, but it may have been more specialized as a fore-flipper swimmer. One species, Enaliarctos emlongi, exhibited notable sexual dimorphism, suggesting that this physical characteristic may have been an important driver of pinniped evolution. A closer relative of extant pinnipeds was Pteronarctos, which lived in Oregon 19–15 mya. As in modern seals, Pteroarctos had an orbital wall that was not limited by certain facial bones (like the jugal or lacrimal bone), but was mostly shaped by the maxilla. The extinct family Desmatophocidae lived 23–10 mya in the North Atlantic and had elongated skulls, fairly large eyes, cheekbones connected by a mortised structure and rounded cheek teeth. They also were sexually dimorphic and may have been capable of propelling themselves with both the foreflippers and hindflippers. Their phylogeny and evolutionary relationship to other pinnipeds is poorly understood although it has been proposed that they may be closer to the otariids than the phocids.

The ancestors of the Otarioidea and Phocoidea diverged 33 mya. Phocids are known to have existed for at least 15 million years, and molecular evidence supports a divergence of the Monachinae and Phocinae lineages 22 mya. The fossil monachine Monotherium and phocine Leptophoca were found in southeastern North America. The deep split between the lineages of Erignathus and Cystophora 17 mya suggests that the phocines migrated eastward and northward from the North Atlantic. The genera Phoca and Pusa could have arisen when a phocine lineage traveled from the Paratethys Sea to the Arctic Basin and subsequently went eastward. The ancestor of the Baikal seal migrated into Lake Baikal from the Arctic (via the Siberian ice sheet) and became isolated there. The Caspian seal's ancestor became isolated as the Paratethys shrank, leaving the animal in a small remnant sea, the Caspian Sea. The monochines diversified southward. Monachus emerged in the Mediterranean and migrated to the Caribbean and then the central North Pacific. The two extant elephant seal species diverged close to 4 mya after the Panamanian isthmus was formed. The lobodontine lineage emerged around 9 mya and colonized the southern ocean in response to glaciation.

The lineages of Otariidae and Odobenidae split almost 28 mya. Otariids originated in the North Pacific. The earliest fossil Pithanotaria, found in California, is dated to 11 mya. The Callorhinus lineage split earlier at 16 mya. Zalophus, Eumetopias and Otaria diverged next, with the latter colonizing the coast of South America. Most of the other otariids diversified in the Southern Hemisphere. The earliest fossils of Odobenidae—Prototaria of Japan and Proneotherium of Oregon—date to 18–16 mya. These primitive walruses had much shorter canines and lived on a fish diet rather than a specialized mollusk diet like the modern walrus. Odobenids further diversified in the middle and late Miocene. Several species had enlarged upper and lower canines. The genera Valenictus and Odobenus developed elongated tusks. The lineage of the modern walrus may have spread from the North Pacific to the Caribbean (via the Central American Seaway) 8–5 mya and subsequently made it to the North Atlantic and returned to the North Pacific via the Arctic 1 mya. Alternatively, this lineage may have spread from the North Pacific to the Arctic and subsequently the North Atlantic during the Pleistocene.

Anatomy and physiology

Pinnipeds have streamlined, spindle-shaped bodies with reduced or non-existent external ear flaps, rounded heads, flexible necks, limbs modified into flippers, and small tails. Pinniped skulls have large eye orbits, short snouts and a constricted interorbital region. They are unique among carnivorans in that their orbital walls are mostly shaped by the maxilla which are not contained by certain facial bones. Compared to other carnivorans, their teeth tend to be fewer in number (especially incisors and back molars), are pointed and cone-shaped, and lack carnassials. The walrus has unique upper canines that are elongated into tusks. The mammary glands and genitals of pinnipeds can retract into the body.

Overall, they tend to be larger than other carnivorans; the southern elephant seal is the largest carnivoran. Several species have male-biased sexual dimorphism that correlates with the degree of polygyny in a species: highly polygynous species like elephant seals are extremely sexually dimorphic, while less polygynous species have males and females that are closer in size. In lobodontine seals, females are slightly larger than males. Males of sexually dimorphic species also tend to have secondary sex characteristics, such as the prominent proboscis of elephant seals, the inflatable red nasal membrane of hooded seals and the thick necks and manes of otariids. Despite a correlation between size dimorphism and the degree of polygyny, some evidence suggests that size differences between the sexes originated due to ecological differences and prior to the development of polygyny.

Almost all pinnipeds have fur coats, the exception being the walrus, which is only sparsely covered. Even some fully furred species (particularly sea lions) are less haired than most land mammals. In species that live on ice, young pups have thicker coats than adults. The individual hairs on the coat, known collectively as lanugo, can trap heat from sunlight and keep the pup warm. Pinnipeds are typically countershaded, and are darker colored dorsally and lighter colored ventrally, which serves to eliminate shadows caused by light shining over the ocean water. The pure white fur of harp seal pups conceals them in their Arctic environment. Some species, such as ribbon seals, ringed seals and leopard seals, have patterns of contrasting light and dark coloration. All fully furred species molt; phocids molt once a year, while otariids gradually molt all year. Seals have a layer of subcutaneous fat known as blubber that is particularly thick in phocids and walruses. Blubber serves both to keep the animals warm and to provide energy and nourishment when they are fasting. It can constitute as much as 50% of a pinniped's body weight. Pups are born with only a thin layer of blubber, but some species compensate for this with thick lanugos.

Pinnipeds have a simple stomach that is similar in structure to terrestrial carnivores. Most species have neither a cecum nor a clear demarcation between the small and large intestines; the large intestine is comparatively short and only slightly wider than the small intestine. Small intestine lengths range from 8 times (California sea lion) to 25 times (elephant seal) the body length. The length of the intestine may be an adaptation to frequent deep diving, as the increased volume of the digestive tract serves as an extended storage compartment for partially digested food during submersion. Pinnipeds do not have an appendix. As in most marine mammals, the kidneys are divided into small lobes and can effectively absorb water and filter out excess salt.

Locomotion

Pinnipeds have two pairs of flippers on the front and back, the fore-flippers and hind-flippers. The elbows and ankles are enclosed within the body. Seals are more agile and flexible, and some otariids, such as the California sea lion, are capable of bending their necks backwards far enough to reach their hind-flippers, allowing them to make dorsal turns. Pinnipeds have several adaptions for reducing drag. In addition to their streamlined bodies, they have smooth networks of muscle bundles in their skin that may increase laminar flow and make it easier for them to slip through water. They also lack arrector pili, so their fur can be streamlined as they swim.

When swimming, otariids rely on their fore-flippers for locomotion in a wing-like manner similar to penguins and sea turtles. Fore-flipper movement is not continuous, and the animal glides between each stroke. Compared to terrestrial carnivorans, the fore-limbs of otariids are reduced in length, which gives the locomotor muscles at the shoulder and elbow joints greater mechanical advantage; the hind-flippers serve as stabilizers. Phocids and walruses swim by moving their hind-flippers and lower body from side to side, while their fore-flippers are mainly used for steering. Some species leap out of the water, which may allow them to travel faster. In addition, sea lions are known to "ride" waves, which probably helps them decrease their energy usage.

Pinnipeds can move around on land, though not as well as terrestrial animals. Otariids and walruses are capable of turning their hind-flippers forward and under the body so they can "walk" on all fours. The fore-flippers move in a transverse, rather than a sagittal fashion. Otariids rely on their head. neck and back spine more than their hind-flippers during terrestrial locomotion. By swinging their heads and necks, otariids create momentum while they are moving. Sea lions have been recorded climbing up flights of stairs. Phocids are less agile on land. They cannot pull their hind-flippers forward, and move on land by lunging, bouncing and wiggling while their fore-flippers keep them balanced. Some species use their fore-flippers to pull themselves forward. Terrestrial locomotion is easier for phocids on ice, as they can sled along.

Senses

The eyes of pinnipeds are relatively large for their size and are positioned near the front of the head. One exception is the walrus, whose smaller eyes are located on the sides of its head. This is because it feeds on immobile bottom dwelling mollusks and hence does not need acute vision. A seal's eye is adapted for seeing both underwater and in air. The lens is mostly spherical, and much of the retina is equidistant from the lens center. The cornea has a flattened center where refraction is nearly equal in both water and air. Pinnipeds also have very muscular and vascularized irises. The well-developed dilator muscle gives the animals a great range in pupil dilation. When contracted, the pupil is typically pear-shaped, although the bearded seal's is more diagonal. In species that live in shallow water, such as harbor seals and California sea lions, dilation varies little, while the deep-diving elephant seals have much greater variation.

On land, pinnipeds are near-sighted in dim light. This is reduced in bright light, as the retracted pupil reduces the lens and cornea's ability to bend light. They also have a well-developed tapetum lucidum, a reflecting layer that increases sensitivity by reflecting light back through the rods. This helps them see in low-light conditions. Ice-living seals like the harp seal have corneas that can tolerate high levels of ultraviolet radiation typical of bright, snowy environments. As such, they do not suffer snow blindness. Pinnipeds appear to have limited color vision, as they lack S-cones. Flexible eye movement has been documented in seals. The extraocular muscles of the walrus are well developed. This and its lack of orbital roof allow it to protrude its eyes and see in both frontal and dorsal directions. Seals release large amounts of mucus to protect their eyes. The corneal epithelium is keratinized and the sclera is thick enough to withstand the pressures of diving. As in many mammals and birds, pinnipeds possess nictitating membranes.

The pinniped ear is adapted for hearing underwater, where it can hear sound frequencies at up to 70,000 Hz. In air, hearing is somewhat reduced in pinnipeds compared to many terrestrial mammals. While they are capable of hearing a wide range of frequencies (e.g. 500 to 32,000 Hz in the northern fur seal, compared to 20 to 20,000 Hz in humans), their airborne hearing sensitivity is weaker overall. One study of three species—the harbor seal, California sea lion and northern elephant seal—found that the sea lion was best adapted for airborne hearing, the harbor seal was equally capable of hearing in air and water, and the elephant seal was better adapted for underwater hearing. Although pinnipeds have a fairly good sense of smell on land, it is useless underwater as their nostrils are closed.

Pinnipeds have well-developed tactile senses. Their mystacial vibrissae have ten times the innervation of terrestrial mammals, allowing them to effectively detect vibrations in the water. These vibrations are generated, for example, when a fish swims through water. Detecting vibrations is useful when the animals are foraging and may add to or even replace vision, particularly in darkness. Harbor seals have been observed following varying paths of another seal that swam ahead several minutes before, similar to a dog following a scent trail, and even to discriminate the species and the size of the fish responsible for the trail.  Blind ringed seals have even been observed successfully hunting on their own in Lake Saimaa, likely relying on their vibrissae to gain sensory information and catch prey.

Unlike terrestrial mammals, such as rodents, pinnipeds do not move their vibrissae over an object when examining it but instead extend their moveable whiskers and keep them in the same position. By holding their vibrissae steady, pinnipeds are able to maximize their detection ability. The vibrissae of phocids are undulated and wavy while otariid and walrus vibrissae are smooth. Research is ongoing to determine the function, if any, of these shapes on detection ability. The vibrissa's angle relative to the flow, not the shape, however, seems to be the most important factor. The vibrissae of some otariids grow quite long—those of the Antarctic fur seal can reach . Walruses have the most vibrissae, at 600–700 individual hairs. These are important for detecting their prey on the muddy sea floor. In addition to foraging, vibrissae may also play a role in navigation; spotted seals appear to use them to detect breathing holes in the ice.

Diving adaptations

Before diving, pinnipeds typically exhale to empty their lungs of half the air and then close their nostrils and throat cartilages to protect the trachea. Their unique lungs have airways that are highly reinforced with cartilaginous rings and smooth muscle, and alveoli that completely deflate during deeper dives. While terrestrial mammals are generally unable to empty their lungs, pinnipeds can reinflate their lungs even after complete respiratory collapse. The middle ear contains sinuses that probably fill with blood during dives, preventing middle ear squeeze. The heart of a seal is moderately flattened to allow the lungs to deflate. The trachea is flexible enough to collapse under pressure. During deep dives, any remaining air in their bodies is stored in the bronchioles and trachea, which prevents them from experiencing decompression sickness, oxygen toxicity and nitrogen narcosis. In addition, seals can tolerate large amounts of lactic acid, which reduces skeletal muscle fatigue during intense physical activity.
 
The main adaptations of the pinniped circulatory system for diving are the enlargement and increased complexity of veins to increase their capacity. Retia mirabilia form blocks of tissue on the inner wall of the thoracic cavity and the body periphery. These tissue masses, which contain extensive contorted spirals of arteries and thin-walled veins, act as blood reservoirs that increase oxygen stores for use during diving. As with other diving mammals, pinnipeds have high amounts of hemoglobin and myoglobin stored in their blood and muscles. This allows them to stay submerged for long periods of time while still having enough oxygen. Deep-diving species such as elephant seals have blood volumes that represent up to 20% of their body weight. When diving, they reduce their heart rate and maintain blood flow only to the heart, brain and lungs. To keep their blood pressure stable, phocids have an elastic aorta that dissipates some of the energy of each heartbeat.

Thermoregulation

Pinnipeds conserve heat with their large and compact body size, insulating blubber and fur, and high metabolism. In addition, the blood vessels in their flippers are adapted for countercurrent exchange. Veins containing cool blood from the body extremities surround arteries, which contain warm blood received from the core of the body. Heat from the arterial blood is transferred to the blood vessels, which then recirculate blood back to the core. The same adaptations that conserve heat while in water tend to inhibit heat loss when out of water. To counteract overheating, many species cool off by flipping sand onto their backs, adding a layer of cool, damp sand that enhances heat loss. The northern fur seal pants to help stay cool, while monk seals often dig holes in the sand to expose cooler layers to rest in.

Sleep
Pinnipeds spend many months at a time at sea, so they must sleep in the water. Scientists have recorded them sleeping for minutes at a time while slowly drifting downward in a belly-up orientation. Like other marine mammals, seals sleep in water with half of their brain awake so that they can detect and escape from predators. When they are asleep on land, both sides of their brain go into sleep mode.

Distribution and habitat

Living pinnipeds mainly inhabit polar and subpolar regions, particularly the North Atlantic, the North Pacific and the Southern Ocean. They are entirely absent from Indomalayan waters. Monk seals and some otariids live in tropical and subtropical waters. Even those that live in warm or tropical climates live in areas that become cold and nutrient rich due to current patterns. Only monk seals live in waters that are not typically cool or rich in nutrients. The Caspian seal and Baikal seal are found in large landlocked bodies of water (the Caspian Sea and Lake Baikal respectively).

As a whole, pinnipeds can be found in a variety of aquatic habitats, including coastal water, open ocean, brackish water and even freshwater lakes and rivers. The Baikal seal is the only exclusively freshwater species. Most seals inhabit coastal areas, though some travel offshore and feed in deep waters off oceanic islands. Pinnipeds also use a number of terrestrial habitats and substrates, both continental and island. In temperate and tropical areas, they haul out on to sandy and pebble beaches, rocky shores, shoals, mud flats, tide pools and in sea caves. Some species also rest on man-made structures, like piers, jetties, buoys and oil platforms. Pinnipeds may move further inland and rest in sand dunes or vegetation, and may even climb cliffs. Polar-living species haul out on to both fast ice and drift ice. They use the ice platforms for breeding and raising young seal pups. Ringed seals build dens underneath fast ice.

Behavior and life history

Pinnipeds have an amphibious lifestyle; they spend most of their lives in the water, but haul out to mate, raise young, molt, rest, thermoregulate or escape from aquatic predators. Several species are known to migrate vast distances, particularly in response to extreme environmental changes, like El Niño or changes in ice cover. Elephant seals stay at sea 8–10 months a year and migrate between breeding and molting sites. Phocids tend to migrate more than otariids. Traveling seals may use various features of their environment to reach their destination including geomagnetic fields, water and wind currents, the position of the sun and moon and the taste and temperature of the water.

Pinnipeds may dive during foraging or to avoid predators. Northern elephant seals commonly dive  for as long as 20 minutes. They can also dive  and for as long as 77 minutes. The dives of otariids tend to be shorter and less deep. Walruses do not often dive very deep, as they feed in shallow water.

Pinnipeds have lifespans averaging 25–30 years. Females usually live longer, as males tend to fight and often die before reaching maturity. The longest recorded lifespans include 43 years for a wild female ringed seal and 46 years for a wild female grey seal. The age at which a pinniped sexually matures can vary from 2–12 years depending on the species. Females typically mature earlier than males.

Foraging and predation

All pinnipeds are carnivorous and predatory. As a whole, they mostly feed on fish and cephalopods, followed by crustaceans and bivalves, and then zooplankton and endothermic ("warm-blooded") prey like sea birds. While most species are generalist and opportunistic feeders, a few are specialists. Examples include the crabeater seal, which primarily eats krill, the ringed seal, which eats mainly crustaceans, the Ross seal and southern elephant seal, which specialize on squid, and the bearded seal and walrus, which feed on clams and other bottom-dwelling invertebrates. 

Pinnipeds may hunt solitarily or cooperatively. The former behavior is typical when hunting non-schooling fish, slow-moving or immobile invertebrates or endothermic prey. Solitary foraging species usually exploit coastal waters, bays and rivers. An exception to this is the northern elephant seal, which feeds on fish at great depths in the open ocean. In addition, walruses feed solitarily but are often near other walruses in small or large groups that may surface and dive in unison. When large schools of fish or squid are available, pinnipeds such as certain otariids hunt cooperatively in large groups, locating and herding their prey. Some species, such as California and South American sea lions, may forage with cetaceans and sea birds.

Seals typically consume their prey underwater where it is swallowed whole. Prey that is too large or awkward is taken to the surface to be torn apart. The leopard seal, a prolific predator of penguins, is known to violently swing its prey back and forth until it is dead. The elaborately cusped teeth of filter-feeding species, such as crabeater seals, allow them to remove water before they swallow their planktonic food. The walrus is unique in that it consumes its prey by suction feeding, using its tongue to suck the meat of a bivalve out of the shell. While pinnipeds mostly hunt in the water, South American sea lions are known to chase down penguins on land. Some species may swallow stones or pebbles for reasons not understood. Though they can drink seawater, pinnipeds get most of their fluid intake from the food they eat.

Pinnipeds themselves are subject to predation. Most species are preyed on by the orca. To subdue and kill seals, orcas continuously ram them with their heads, slap them with their tails and fling them in the air. They are typically hunted by groups of 10 or fewer whales, but they are occasionally hunted by larger groups or by lone individuals. Pups are more commonly taken by orcas, but adults can be targeted as well. Large sharks are another major predator of pinnipeds—usually the great white shark but also the tiger shark and mako shark. Sharks usually attack by ambushing them from below. The prey usually escapes, and seals are often seen with shark-inflicted wounds. Otariids typically have injuries in the hindquarters, while phocids usually have injuries on the forequarters. Pinnipeds are also targeted by terrestrial and pagophilic predators. The polar bear is well adapted for hunting Arctic seals and walruses, particularly pups. Bears are known to use sit-and-wait tactics as well as active stalking and pursuit of prey on ice or water. Other terrestrial predators include cougars, brown hyenas and various species of canids, which mostly target the young. 

Pinnipeds lessen the chance of predation by gathering in groups. Some species are capable of inflicting damaging wounds on their attackers with their sharp canines—an adult walrus is capable of killing polar bears. When out at sea, northern elephant seals dive out of the reach of surface-hunting orcas and white sharks. In the Antarctic, which lacks terrestrial predators, pinniped species spend more time on the ice than their Arctic counterparts. Arctic seals use more breathing holes per individual, appear more restless when hauled out, and rarely defecate on the ice. Ringed seals rely on their dens for protection.

Interspecific predation among pinnipeds does occur. The leopard seal is known to prey on numerous other species, especially the crabeater seal. Leopard seals typically target crabeater pups, which form an important part of their diet from November to January. Older crabeater seals commonly bear scars from failed leopard seal attacks; a 1977 study found that 75% of a sample of 85 individual crabeaters had these scars. Walruses, despite being specialized for feeding on bottom-dwelling invertebrates, occasionally prey on Arctic seals. They kill their prey with their long tusks and eat their blubber and skin. Steller sea lions have been recorded eating the pups of harbor seals, northern fur seals and California sea lions. New Zealand sea lions feed on pups of some fur seal species, and the South American sea lion may prey on South American fur seals.

Reproductive behavior

The mating system of pinnipeds varies from extreme polygyny to serial monogamy. Of the 33 species, 20 breed on land, and the remaining 13 breed on ice. Species that breed on land are usually polygynous, as females gather in large aggregations and males are able to mate with them as well as defend them from rivals. Polygynous species include elephant seals, grey seals and most otariids. Land-breeding pinnipeds tend to mate on islands where there are fewer terrestrial predators. Few islands are favorable for breeding, and those that are tend to be crowded. Since the land they breed on is fixed, females return to the same sites for many years. The males arrive earlier in the season and wait for them. The males stay on land and try to mate with as many females as they can; some of them will even fast. If a male leaves the beach to feed, he will likely lose mating opportunities and his dominance. 

Polygynous species also tend to be extremely sexual dimorphic in favor of males. This dimorphism manifests itself in larger chests and necks, longer canines and denser fur—all traits that help males in fights for females. Increased body weight in males increases the length of time they can fast due to the ample energy reserves stored in the blubber. Larger males also likely enjoy access to feeding grounds that smaller ones are unable to access due to their lower thermoregulatory ability and decreased energy stores. In some instances, only the largest males are able to reach the furthest deepest foraging grounds where they enjoy maximum energetic yields that are unavailable to smaller males and females.

Other seals, like the walrus and most phocids, breed on ice with copulation usually taking place in the water (a few land-breeding species also mate in water). Females of these species tend to aggregate less. In addition, since ice is less stable than solid land, breeding sites change location each year, and males are unable to predict where females will stay during the breeding season. Hence polygyny tends to be weaker in ice-breeding species. An exception to this is the walrus, where females form dense aggregations perhaps due to their patchy food sources. Pinnipeds that breed on fast ice tend to cluster together more than those that breed on drift ice. Some of these species are serially monogamous, including the harp seal, crabeater seal and hooded seal. Seals that breed on ice tend to have little or no sexual dimorphism. In lobodontine seals, females are slightly longer than males. Walruses and hooded seals are unique among ice-breeding species in that they have pronounced sexual dimorphism in favor of males.

Adult male pinnipeds have several strategies to ensure reproductive success. Otariids establish territories containing resources that attract females, such as shade, tide pools or access to water. Territorial boundaries are usually marked by natural breaks in the substrate, and some may be fully or partially underwater. Males defend their territorial boundaries with threatening vocalizations and postures, but physical fights are usually avoided. Individuals also return to the same territorial site each breeding season. In certain species, like the Steller sea lion and northern fur seal, a dominant male can maintain a territory for as long as 2–3 months. Females can usually move freely between territories and males are unable to coerce them, but in some species such as the northern fur seal, South American sea lion and Australian sea lion, males can successfully contain females in their territories and prevent them from leaving. In some phocid species, like the harbor seal, Weddell seal and bearded seal, the males have underwater territories called "maritories" near female haul-out areas. These are also maintained by vocalizations. The maritories of Weddell seal males can overlap with female breathing holes in the ice.

Lek systems are known to exist among some populations of walruses. These males cluster around females and try to attract them with elaborate courtship displays and vocalizations. Lekking may also exist among California sea lions, South American fur seals, New Zealand sea lions and harbor seals. In some species, including elephant seals and grey seals, males will try to lay claim to the desired females and defend them from rivals. Elephant seal males establish dominance hierarchies with the highest ranking males—the alpha males—maintaining harems of as many as 30–100 females. These males commonly disrupt the copulations of their subordinates while they themselves can mount without inference. They will, however, break off mating to chase off a rival. Grey seal males usually claim a location among a cluster of females whose members may change over time, while males of some walrus populations try to monopolize access to female herds. Male harp seals, crabeater seals and hooded seals follow and defend lactating females in their vicinity—usually one or two at a time, and wait for them to reach estrus.

Younger or subdominant male pinnipeds may attempt to achieve reproductive success in other ways. Subadult elephant seals will sneak into female clusters and try to blend in by pulling in their noses. They also harass and attempt to mate with females that head out to the water. In otariid species like the South American and Australian sea lions, non-territorial subadults form "gangs" and cause chaos within the breeding rookeries to increase their chances of mating with females. Alternative mating strategies also exist in young male grey seals, which do have some success.

Female pinnipeds do appear to have some choice in mates, particularly in lek-breeding species like the walrus, but also in elephant seals where the males try to dominate all the females that they want to mate with. When a female elephant seal or grey seal is mounted by an unwanted male, she tries to squirm and get away, while croaking and slapping him with her tail. This commotion attracts other males to the scene, and the most dominant will end the copulation and attempt to mate with the female himself. Dominant female elephant seals stay in the center of the colony where they are more likely to mate with a dominant male, while peripheral females are more likely to mate with subordinates. Female Steller sea lions are known to solicit mating with their territorial males.

Birth and parenting
With the exception of the walrus, which has five- to six-year-long inter-birth intervals, female pinnipeds enter estrous shortly after they give birth. All species go through delayed implantation, wherein the embryo remains in suspended development for weeks or months before it is implanted in the uterus. Delayed implantation postpones the birth of young until the female hauls-out on land or until conditions for birthing are favorable. Gestation in seals (including delayed implantation) typically lasts a year. For most species, birthing takes place in the spring and summer months. Typically, single pups are born; twins are uncommon and have high mortality rates. Pups of most species are born precocial.

Unlike terrestrial mammals, pinniped milk has little to no lactose. Mother pinnipeds have different strategies for maternal care and lactation. Phocids such as elephant seals, grey seals and hooded seals remain on land or ice and fast during their relatively short lactation period–four days for the hooded seal and five weeks for elephant seals. The milk of these species consist of up to 60% fat, allowing the young to grow fairly quickly. In particular, northern elephant seal pups gain  each day before they are weaned. Some pups may try to steal extra milk from other nursing mothers and gain weight more quickly than others. Alloparenting occurs in these fasting species; while most northern elephant seal mothers nurse their own pups and reject nursings from alien pups, some do accept alien pups with their own.

For otariids and some phocids like the harbor seal, mothers fast and nurse their pups for a few days at a time. In between nursing bouts, the females leave their young onshore to forage at sea. These foraging trips may last anywhere between a day and two weeks, depending on the abundance of food and the distance of foraging sites. While their mothers are away, the pups will fast. Lactation in otariids may last 6–11 months; in the Galápagos fur seal it can last as long as 3 years. Pups of these species are weaned at lower weights than their phocid counterparts. Walruses are unique in that mothers nurse their young at sea. The female rests at the surface with its head held up, and the young suckle upside down. Young pinnipeds typically learn to swim on their own and some species can even swim at birth. Other species may wait days or weeks before entering the water. Elephant seals do not swim until weeks after they are weaned.

Male pinnipeds generally play little role in raising the young. Male walruses may help inexperienced young as they learn to swim, and have even been recorded caring for orphans. Male California sea lions have been observed to help shield swimming pups from predators. Males can also pose threats to the safety of pups. In terrestrially breeding species, pups may get crushed by fighting males. Subadult male South America sea lions sometimes abduct pups from their mothers and treat them like adult males treat females. This helps them gain experience in controlling females. Pups can get severely injured or killed during abductions. Female New Zealand sea lions move inland with their pups to protect them.

Communication

Pinnipeds can produce a number of vocalizations such as barks, grunts, rasps, rattles, growls, creaks, warbles, trills, chirps, chugs, clicks and whistles. While most vocals are audible to the human ear, a captive leopard seal was recorded making ultrasonic calls underwater. In addition, the vocals of northern elephant seals may produce infrasonic vibrations. Vocals are produced both in air and underwater. Otariids are more vocal on land, while phocids are more vocal in water. Antarctic seals are more vocal on land or ice than Arctic seals due to a lack of terrestrial and pagophilic predators like the polar bear. Male vocals are usually of lower frequencies than those of the females. 

Vocalizations are particularly important during the breeding seasons. Dominant male elephant seals advertise their status and threaten rivals with "clap-threats" and loud drum-like calls that may be modified by the proboscis. Male otariids have strong barks, growls, roars and "whickers". Male walruses are known to produce distinctive gong-like calls when attempting to attract females. They can also create somewhat musical sounds with their inflated throats.

The Weddell seal has perhaps the most elaborate vocal repertoire with separate sounds for airborne and underwater contexts.  Underwater vocals include trills, chirps, chugs and knocks. The calls appear to contain prefixes and suffixes that serve to emphasize a message. The underwater vocals of Weddell seals can last 70 seconds, which is long for a marine mammal call. Some calls have around seven rhythm patterns and are comparable to birdsongs and whalesongs. Similar calls have been recorded in other lobodontine seals and in bearded seals. 

In some pinniped species, there appear to be geographic differences in vocalizations, known as dialects, while certain species may even have individual variations in expression. These differences are likely important for mothers and pups who need to remain in contact on crowded beaches. Otariid females and their young use mother-pup attraction calls to help them reunite when the mother returns from foraging at sea. The calls are described are "loud" and "bawling". Female elephant seals make an unpulsed attraction call when responding to their young. When threatened by other adults or when pups try to suckle, females make a harsh, pulsed call. Pups may also vocalize when playing, in distress or when prodding their mothers to allow them to suckle.

Non-vocal communication is not as common in pinnipeds as in cetaceans. Nevertheless, when disturbed by intruders harbor seals and Baikal seals may slap their fore-flippers against their bodies as warnings. Teeth chattering, hisses and exhalations are also made as aggressive warnings. Visual displays also occur: Weddell seals will make an S-shaped posture when patrolling under the ice, and Ross seals will display the stripes on their chests and teeth when approached. Male hooded seals use their inflatable nasal membranes to display to and attract females.

Intelligence
In a match-to-sample task study, a single California sea lion was able to demonstrate an understanding of symmetry, transitivity and equivalence; a second seal was unable to complete the tasks. They demonstrate the ability to understand simple syntax and commands when taught an artificial sign language, though they only rarely used the signs semantically or logically. In 2011, a captive California sea lion named Ronan was recorded bobbing its head in synchrony to musical rhythms. This "rhythmic entrainment" was previously seen only in humans, parrots and other birds possessing vocal mimicry. Adult male elephant seals appear to memorize both the rhythm and timbre of their rivals' calls. In 1971, a captive harbor seal named Hoover was trained to imitate human words, phrases and laughter. 

For sea lions used in entertainment, trainers toss a ball at the animal so it may accidentally balance it or hold the ball on its nose, thereby gaining an understanding of the behavior desired. It may require a year to train a sea lion to perform a trick for the public. Its long-term memory allows it to perform a trick after at least three months of non-performance.

Human relations

Cultural depictions

Various human cultures have for millennia depicted pinnipeds. The anthropologist, A. Asbjørn Jøn, has analysed beliefs of the Celts of Orkney and Hebrides who believed in selkies—seals that could change into humans and walk on land. Seals are also of great importance in the culture of the Inuit. In Inuit mythology, the goddess Sedna rules over the sea and marine animals. She is depicted as a mermaid, occasionally with a seal's lower body. In one legend, seals, whales and other marine mammals were formed from her severed fingers. One of the earliest Ancient Greek coins depicts the head of a seal, and the animals were mentioned by Homer and Aristotle. The Greeks associated them with both the sea and sun and were considered to be under the protection of the gods Poseidon and Apollo. The Moche people of ancient Peru worshipped the sea and its animals, and often depicted sea lions in their art. In modern culture, pinnipeds are thought of as cute, playful and comical figures.

In captivity
Pinnipeds can be found in facilities around the world, as their large size and playfulness make them popular attractions. Seals have been kept in captivity since at least Ancient Rome and their trainability was noticed by Pliny the Elder. Zoologist Georges Cuvier noted during the 19th century that wild seals show considerable fondness for humans and stated that they are second only to some monkeys among wild animals in their easy tamability. Francis Galton noted in his landmark paper on domestication that seals were a spectacular example of an animal that would most likely never be domesticated despite their friendliness and desire for comfort due to the fact that they serve no practical use for humans.

Some modern exhibits have rocky backgrounds with artificial haul-out sites and a pool, while others have pens with small rocky, elevated shelters where the animals can dive into their pools. More elaborate exhibits contain deep pools that can be viewed underwater with rock-mimicking cement as haul-out areas. The most common pinniped species kept in captivity is the California sea lion, as it is both easy to train and adaptable. Other popularly kept species include the grey seal and harbor seal. Larger animals like walruses and Steller sea lions are much less common. Some organizations, such as the Humane Society of the United States and World Animal Protection, object to keeping pinnipeds and other marine mammals in captivity. They state that the exhibits could not be large enough to house animals that have evolved to be migratory, and a pool could never replace the size and biodiversity of the ocean. They also state that the tricks performed for audiences are "exaggerated variations of their natural behaviors" and distract the people from the animal's unnatural environment.

California sea lions are used in military applications by the U.S. Navy Marine Mammal Program, including detecting naval mines and enemy divers. In the Persian Gulf, the animals have been trained to swim behind divers approaching a U.S. naval ship and attach a clamp with a rope to the diver's leg. Navy officials say that the sea lions can do this in seconds, before the enemy realizes what happened. Organizations like PETA believe that such operations put the animals in danger. The Navy insists that the sea lions are removed once their mission is complete.

Hunting

Humans have hunted seals since the Stone Age. Originally, seals were hit with clubs during haul-out. Eventually, seal hunters used harpoons to spear the animals from boats out at sea, and hooks for killing pups on ice or land. They were also trapped in nets. The use of firearms in seal hunting during the modern era drastically increased the number of killings. Pinnipeds are typically hunted for their meat and blubber. The skins of fur seals and phocids are made into coats, and the tusks of walruses continue to be used for carvings or as ornaments. There is a distinction between the subsistence hunting of seals by indigenous peoples of the Arctic and commercial hunting: subsistence hunters typically use seal products for themselves and depend on them for survival. National and international authorities have given special treatment to aboriginal hunters since their methods of killing are seen as less destructive and wasteful. This distinction is being questioned as indigenous people are using more modern weaponry and mechanized transport to hunt with, and are selling seal products in the marketplace. Some anthropologists argue that the term "subsistence" should also apply to these cash-based exchanges as long as they take place within local production and consumption. More than 100,000 phocids (especially ringed seals) as well as around 10,000 walruses are harvested annually by native hunters.

Commercial sealing was historically just as important an industry as whaling. Exploited species included harp seals, hooded seals, Caspian seals, elephant seals, walruses and all species of fur seal. The scale of seal harvesting decreased substantially after the 1960s, after the Canadian government reduced the length of the hunting season and implemented measures to protect adult females. Several species that were commercially exploited have rebounded in numbers; for example, Antarctic fur seals may be as numerous as they were prior to harvesting. The northern elephant seal was hunted to near extinction in the late 19th century, with only a small population remaining on Guadalupe Island. It has since recolonized much of its historic range, but has a population bottleneck. Conversely, the Mediterranean monk seal was extirpated from much of its former range, which stretched from the Mediterranean to the Black Sea and northwest Africa, and only remains in the northeastern Mediterranean and some parts of northwest Africa.

Several species of pinniped continue to be harvested. The Convention for the Conservation of Antarctic Seals allows limited hunting of crabeater seals, leopard seals and Weddell seals. However, Weddell seal hunting is prohibited between September and February if the animal is over one year of age, to ensure breeding stocks are healthy. Other species protected are southern elephant seals, Ross seals and Antarctic fur seals. The Government of Canada permits the hunting of harp seals. This has been met with controversy and debate. Proponents of seal hunts insist that the animals are killed humanely and the white-coated pups are not taken, while opponents argue that it is irresponsible to kill harp seals as they are already threatened by declining habitat.

The Caribbean monk seal has been killed and exploited by Europeans settlers and their descendants since 1494, starting with Christopher Columbus himself. The seals were easy targets for organized sealers, fishermen, turtle hunters and buccaneers because they evolved with little pressure from terrestrial predators and were thus "genetically tame". In the Bahamas, as many as 100 seals were slaughtered in one night. In the mid-nineteenth century, the species was thought to have gone extinct until a small colony was found near the Yucatán Peninsula in 1886. Seal killings continued, and the last reliable report of the animal alive was in 1952. The IUCN declared it extinct in 1996. The Japanese sea lion was common around the Japanese islands, but overexploitation and competition from fisheries drastically decreased the population in the 1930s. The last recorded individual was a juvenile in 1974.

Conservation issues
As of 2021, the International Union for Conservation of Nature (IUCN) recognizes 36 pinniped species. With the Japanese sea lion and the Caribbean monk seal recently extinct, ten more are considered at risk, as they are ranked "Endangered" (Hawaiian monk seal, Mediterranean monk seal, Galápagos fur seal, Australian sea lion, New Zealand sea lion, Caspian seal, and Galápagos sea lion) or "Vulnerable" (northern fur seal, hooded seal, and walrus). There has been some debate over the cause of the decline of Steller sea lions in Alaska since the 1970s.

Pinnipeds face various threats. They are unintentionally caught in fishing nets by commercial fisheries and accidentally swallow fishing hooks. Gillnetting and Seine netting is a significant cause of mortality in seals and other marine mammals. Species commonly entangled include California sea lions, Hawaiian monk seals, northern fur seals and brown fur seals. Pinnipeds are also affected by marine pollution. High levels of organic chemicals accumulate in these animals since they are near the top of food chains and have large reserves of blubber. Lactating mothers can pass the toxins on to their young. These pollutants can cause gastrointestinal cancers, decreased reproductivity and greater vulnerability to infectious diseases. Other man-made threats include habitat destruction by oil and gas exploitation, encroachment by boats, and underwater noise.

Species that live in polar habitats are vulnerable to the effects of climate change on oceans, particularly declines in sea ice. In 2010 and 2011, sea ice in the Northwest Atlantic was at or near an all-time low and harp seals as well as ringed seals that bred on thin ice saw increased death rates. Antarctic fur seals in South Georgia in the South Atlantic Ocean saw extreme reductions over a 20-year study, during which scientists measured increased sea surface temperature anomalies.

Some species have become so numerous that they conflict with local people. In the United States, pinnipeds are protected under the Marine Mammal Protection Act of 1972 (MMPA). Since that year, California sea lion populations have risen to 250,000. These animals began exploiting more man-made environments, like docks, for haul-out sites. Many docks are not designed to withstand the weight of several resting sea lions. Wildlife managers have used various methods to control the animals, and some city officials have redesigned docks so they can better withstand use by sea lions. As consequence, they have been hit by cars on roads, deliberately killed, and disturbed by domestic dogs. Human infrastructures such as residential areas, roads, fences, and private lands have also affected their dispersal and breeding success. Conservation efforts are being made by predicting potential areas of human-wildlife conflict to direct proactive measures that facilitate coexistence between humans and this endangered species, such as making road signs and engaging with local communities. 

Seals also conflict with fisherman. In 2007, MMPA was amended to permit the lethal removal of sea lions from salmon runs at Bonneville Dam. In the 1980s and 1990s, South African politicians and fisherman demanded that brown fur seals be culled, believing that the animals competed with commercial fisheries. Scientific studies found that culling fur seals would actually have a negative effect on the fishing industry, and the culling option was dropped in 1993.

Notes

References

Bibliography

External links

 
 
 
Seal hunting